This article details the Bradford Bulls rugby league football club's 2010 season, the fifteenth season of the Super League era.

Season Review

December 2009

January 2010

February 2010

2010 Milestones

Round 1: Brett Kearney, Matt Orford, Heath L'Estrange and Glenn Hall made their debuts for the Bulls.
Round 2: Matt Orford scored his 1st try and kicked his 1st goal for the Bulls.
Round 3: Brett Kearney scored his 1st try for the Bulls.
Round 3: Matt Orford kicked his 1st drop goal for the Bulls.
Round 4: Paul Sykes kicked his 1st drop goal for the Bulls.
Round 5: Glenn Hall scored his 1st try for the Bulls.
Round 10: Michael Platt scored his 25th try and reached 100 points for the Bulls.
Round 11: Rikki Sheriffe scored his 1st hat-trick for the Bulls.
CCR4: Heath L'Estrange scored his 1st try for the Bulls.
CCR4: Danny Addy made his debut for the Bulls.
CCR4: Danny Addy scored his 1st try and kicked his 1st goal for the Bulls.
CCR5: Chris Nero scored his 2nd hat-trick for the Bulls.
CCR5: Glenn Hall kicked his 1st goal for the Bulls.
Round 14: Chris Nero scored his 25th try and reached 100 points for the Bulls.
Round 14: Paul Sykes reached 200 points for the Bulls.
CCQF: Joe Wardle made his debut for the Bulls.
Round 17: Steve Crossley made his debut for the Bulls.
Round 17: Dave Halley scored his 25th try and reached 100 points for the Bulls.
Round 18: Cain Southernwood made his debut for the Bulls.
Round 21: Steve Crossley scored his 1st try for the Bulls.
Round 22: Vinny Finigan made his debut for the Bulls.
Round 22: Vinny Finigan scored his 1st try for the Bulls.
Round 22: Steve Menzies scored his 25th try and reached 100 points for the Bulls.
Round 24: Tom Olbison scored his 1st try for the Bulls.

Pre Season Friendlies

Bulls score is first.

Table

2010 Fixtures and Results

2010 Engage Super League

Player Appearances
Super League Only

 = Injured

 = Suspended

Challenge Cup

Player appearances

2010 squad statistics

 Appearances and Points include (Super League, Challenge Cup and Play-offs) as of 3 September 2010.

 = Injured
 = Suspended

2010 transfers in/out
In

 
Out

References

Bradford Bulls Website
Bradford Bulls in T&A
Bradford Bulls on Sky Sports
Bradford on Super League Site
Red,Black And Amber
BBC Sport-Rugby League 

Bradford Bulls seasons
Bradford Bulls season